USS Niantic (CVE-46) was a US escort carrier, that served in the Royal Navy as HMS Ranee (D03).

Niantic, originally given the designation AVG-46, was redesignated as ACV-46 on 20 August 1942. The ship's keel was laid down by the Seattle-Tacoma Shipbuilding Corporation at their yard in Tacoma, Washington on 5 January 1943. The vessel was launched on 2 June, sponsored by Mrs. Ray V. Blanco. She was redesignated again to CVE-46 on 15 July that year and transferred to the United Kingdom under Lend-Lease on 8 November, when she was commissioned into the Royal Navy.

As one of the 38 converted C3 escort carriers transferred to the United Kingdom, Ranee joined the merchant aircraft carriers guarding the Atlantic convoy routes. Assigned to the Western Approaches, her aircraft helped to turn the tables on foraging U-boats in the North Atlantic and also assisted in operations to close their northern transit into the Atlantic and track them down in the Bay of Biscay. On 27 February 1945 she sailed from San Diego with USMC squadron VMO-7 embarked for Pearl Harbor. Serving with Training Squadron, Western Approaches, at the end of 1945, she was returned to US custody at Norfolk, Virginia on 21 November 1946. She was declared not essential to the defense of the US, and struck from the Navy List on 22 January 1947. She was sold into merchant service 9 June 1947 to the Waterman Steamship Corporation, in Mobile, Alabama as Friesland (later Pacific Breeze). She was sold for scrap in Taiwan in 1974.

Design and description
These ships were larger and had a greater aircraft capacity than all the preceding American built escort carriers. They were also all laid down as escort carriers and not converted merchant ships.

Aircraft facilities were a small combined bridge/flight control on the starboard side, two aircraft lifts , one aircraft catapult and nine arrestor wires. Aircraft could be housed in the  hangar below the flight deck. The ship's armament comprised: two 4"/50, 5"/38 or 5"/51 dual purpose guns in single mounts, sixteen 40 mm Bofors anti-aircraft guns in twin mounts and twenty 20 mm Oerlikon anti-aircraft cannon in single mounts. She had a maximum aircraft capacity of twenty-four aircraft which could be a mixture of Grumman Martlet, Vought F4U Corsair or Hawker Sea Hurricane fighter aircraft and Fairey Swordfish or Grumman Avenger anti-submarine torpedo bombers.

References

Sources

 

 

Ships built in Tacoma, Washington
1943 ships
Ruler-class escort carriers